Langworthy is a tram stop on the Eccles Line of Greater Manchester's light rail Metrolink system. It opened to passengers on 12 June 1999, as part of Phase 2 of the network's expansion, in the Langworthy area of Salford, in North West England.

Langworthy Metrolink stop is located on the corner of Langworthy Road and Eccles New Road (the A57). The area to the south and west of the station is largely commercial and industrial. The area to the north along Langworthy Road mostly comprises terraced buildings. The area to the east of Langworthy Road is currently undergoing intensive redevelopment.

This stop lies within ticketing Zone 2.

Services

Service pattern
12 minute service to Ashton-under-Lyne (via MediaCityUK at offpeak times).
12 minute service to Eccles.

Connecting bus routes
Langworthy station is served by Go North West service 33, which runs to Manchester and to Worsley via Eccles.

Also, stopping nearby is Stagecoach Manchester service 50, branded as City Connect linking Salford Shopping Centre in Pendleton, Salford Crescent railway station, Salford University, Salford Central railway station, Manchester and East Didsbury with Salford Quays and MediaCityUK.

References

External links

Langworthy Stop Information
Langworthy area map

Tram stops in Salford
Tram stops on the Eccles to Piccadilly line